Miley Naa Miley Hum is a 2011 Indian film directed by Tanveer Khan, and marking the debut of Chirag Paswan, son of politician Ram Vilas Paswan. The film stars Kangana Ranaut, Neeru Bajwa and Sagarika Ghatge. The film released on 4 November 2011.

The film went unnoticed and was considered a box office disaster. Subsequently, Paswan turned to politics and was elected to the Jamui seat in Bihar in the 2014 Lok Sabha elections.

Plot
Chirag comes from a wealthy background and assists his father, Siddharth Mehra, in managing and maintaining their land. Chirag's parents have been divorced due to incompatibility arising mainly due to his businesswoman mother, Shalini's hatred of tennis, a sport that Chirag wants to play professionally.

Shalini and Siddharth would like to see Chirag married and accordingly Shalini picks London-based Kamiah, while Siddharth picks Bhatinda-based Manjeet Ahluwalia. Chirag, who sneaks off to practice tennis at night, is asked to make a choice but informs them that he is in love with a model named Anishka (Kangana Ranaut). The displeased couple decide to confront and put pressure on a struggling and unknowing klutz-like Anishka to leave their son alone but they fail.

In the end, Chirag's parents realize their mistake and together attend Chirag's tennis match and give blessings to Chirag and Anishka.

Critical reception
Taran Adarsh of gave the film 2.5 stars and claimed that Miley Naa Miley Hum is an absorbing fare with decent merits.

Komal Nahta of Koimoi.com gave the film 0.5 stars out of 5 saying that the film lacks merits to work at the box office.

Cast
Chirag Paswan as Chirag Mehra
Kangana Ranaut as Anishka Srivastava
Kabir Bedi as Siddharth Mehra
Poonam Dhillon as Shalini Mehra
Sagarika Ghatge as Kamiah
Neeru Bajwa as Manjeet
Dalip Tahil
Suresh Menon
Tanya Abrol
Kunal Kumar
Shweta Tiwari (Special Appearance in a song)

Soundtrack

References

External links

2010s Hindi-language films
2011 masala films